"I Love You, Suzanne" is a song written and recorded by American musician Lou Reed, released as both a 7" and 12" single from his thirteenth solo studio album, New Sensations (1984). The lead and only single to chart from the album, it peaked at No. 78 on the UK Singles Chart. The music video for "I Love You, Suzanne" received light rotation on MTV.

Composition
Years after the song's release, bass player Fernando Saunders claimed that Robert Quine had  composed the guitar riff for "I Love You, Suzanne" in the studio while the band was rehearsing. Upon hearing Quine's riff, Reed had written the lyrics to the song, but he had failed to give Quine a co-writing credit for the song in the album credits, thus cutting Quine out of royalties which added further strain to their relationship.

Elsewhere, Reed had a different story. "I must have had that riff in my head for six months. It's just a cheap D chord because for what I'm interested in, you don't need a lot of chords. It just came out full-blown, and it was always like that. I sat playing that riff for six months because I'm capable of sitting and playing one riff for hours, and then I said, "Well, it's so simple, why not use it?"

Track listing
7" single
"I Love You, Suzanne"
"Vicious"

12" single
"I Love You, Suzanne"
"Vicious"
"Walk on the Wild Side"

Chart performance

References

External links
 

Lou Reed songs
1984 singles
Songs written by Lou Reed
1984 songs
RCA Records singles